Conactia is a genus of tachinid flies in the family Tachinidae.

Species
Conactia reclinata Townsend, 1927

Distribution
Brazil.

References

Diptera of South America
Exoristinae
Tachinidae genera
Taxa named by Charles Henry Tyler Townsend